Three ships of the United States Navy have been named USS Salem:

  was a scout cruiser in service from 1908 to 1921
  was the civilian vessel Joseph R. Parrott, used as a minelayer from 1942 to 1945
  is a heavy cruiser and museum ship in service from 1949 to 1959

United States Navy ship names